Haemonides cronida is a moth in the Castniidae family. It is found in Peru, Suriname and Venezuela.

Subspecies
Haemonides cronida cronida (Surinam)
Haemonides cronida pebana (Houlbert, 1917) (Peru)

References

Moths described in 1854
Castniidae